Modara Muthugalage Don Nimesh Randika Gayan Perera (born September 5, 1977, in Colombo) is a Sri Lankan first-class cricketer. A genuine all-rounder, Perera is an aggressive left-handed middle to lower order batsman and a leg spin bowler.

After making his first class debut in 1995/96, Perera captained the Sri Lankan Under-19 side in a three-Test series against India the following season. He toured England with the Sri Lankan A team in 1999. The tour began against an ECB XI and he made 110 not out and took 4/25. He made his Twenty20 debut on 17 August 2004, for Chilaw Marians Cricket Club in the 2004 SLC Twenty20 Tournament.

See also
 List of Chilaw Marians Cricket Club players

References

1977 births
Living people
Sri Lankan cricketers
Colombo Cricket Club cricketers
Sebastianites Cricket and Athletic Club cricketers
Chilaw Marians Cricket Club cricketers
Ruhuna cricketers